SiteGround is a web hosting company, founded in 2004 in Sofia, Bulgaria. As of January 2020, it provides hosting for about 2,000,000 domains worldwide. It provides shared hosting, cloud hosting, enterprise solutions, email hosting, and domain registration. In 2019, the company employed about 500 people. It has offices in Sofia, Plovdiv, Stara Zagora and Madrid.

History
SiteGround was founded in 2004 in Sofia by a few university friends. In January 2015, Joomla partnered with SiteGround to offer free websites hosted on Joomla.com.

Server infrastructure and setup
According to the company's website, in May 2020, it had 6 data centers in 6 countries: the United States, the Netherlands, UK, Germany, Australia and Singapore. SiteGround runs CentOS, Apache, Nginx, MySQL, PHP, WHM and its in-house developed control panel – Site Tools on its servers. SiteGround uses solid-state drives to store data.

Products and services
SiteGround provides web hosting services for WordPress, Joomla, Magento, Drupal, PrestaShop and WooCommerce websites. It also has a Weebly connector.  A September 18, 2020, review by PCMag.com praised SiteGround for their strong uptime and customer support, but rated them 3.5/5 overall, before major price increases in 2021 and 2022.

References

External links 
 

Web hosting
Companies established in 2004
Software companies of Bulgaria
Companies based in Sofia